John Houser (December 2, 1909 – December 29, 1991) was an American rower. He competed in the men's double sculls event at the 1936 Summer Olympics.

References

External links
 

1909 births
1991 deaths
American male rowers
Olympic rowers of the United States
Rowers at the 1936 Summer Olympics
Rowers from Philadelphia